The 1952–53 season in Swedish football, starting August 1952 and ending July 1953:

Honours

Official titles

Competitions

Promotions, relegations and qualifications

Promotions

League transfers

Relegations

Domestic results

Allsvenskan 1952–53

Division 2 Nordöstra 1952–53

Division 2 Sydvästra 1952–53

Norrländska Mästerskapet 1953 
Final

National team results

Notes

References 
Print

Online

 
Seasons in Swedish football